Charles Willumsen (24 August 1918 – 27 November 1984) was a Danish rower. He competed at the 1948 Summer Olympics in London with the men's eight where they were eliminated in the round one repêchage.

References

1918 births
1984 deaths
Danish male rowers
Olympic rowers of Denmark
Rowers at the 1948 Summer Olympics
People from Viborg Municipality
European Rowing Championships medalists
Sportspeople from the Central Denmark Region